Arcynopterygini is a tribe of springflies in the family Perlodidae. There are about 11 genera and more than 30 described species in Arcynopterygini.

Genera
These 11 genera belong to the tribe Arcynopterygini:
 Arcynopteryx Klapálek, 1904
 Frisonia Ricker, 1943
 Megarcys Klapálek, 1912
 Neofilchneria Zwick, 1973
 Oroperla Needham, 1933
 Perlinodes Needham & Claassen, 1925
 Pseudomegarcys Kohno, 1946
 Salmoperla Baumann & Lauck, 1987
 Setvena Ricker, 1952
 Skwala Ricker, 1943
 Sopkalia Ricker, 1952

References

Further reading

 
 
 
 

Perlodidae
Articles created by Qbugbot